A picture stone, image stone or figure stone is an ornate slab of stone, usually limestone, which was raised in Germanic Iron Age or Viking Age Scandinavia, and in the greatest number on Gotland. More than four hundred picture stones are known today. All of the stones were probably erected as memorial stones, but only rarely beside graves.  Some of them have been positioned where many people could see them at bridges and on roads.

They mainly differ from runestones by presenting the message in pictures rather than runes.  Some picture stones also have runic inscriptions, but they tell little more than to whom the stone was dedicated. Lacking textual explanations, the image stones are consequently difficult to interpret.  Similar stones in Scotland are known as Pictish stones.

Groups 
The dating of the stones is based on studies of their shapes and ornamentations. Subsequently, three distinct groups of stones exist with various aesthetics, locations and purposes.

400-600 CE 
The first group of picture stones was made in the period 400–600 CE.  These have a straight form and the upper part is shaped like the edge of an axe. The ornamentations are usually circular forms with vortex patterns and spirals, but also with images of ships, people, and animals. These older stones were usually raised within grave fields, albeit not on the graves themselves.

500-700 CE 
The second group of picture stones come from the period 500–700 CE, and they are small stones with stylized patterns.

700-1100 CE 
The third group was made in the period 700–1100 CE and they consist of tall stones with necks and tall bow-shaped profiles. Their ornamentations present a rich array of pictures: ships with checkered sails and scenes with figures in different fields. The borders are often decorated with various plaited patterns. Many scenes show sacrifices and battles, and a common scene on the stones is a man, riding a horse, welcomed by a woman holding a drinking horn.  What is seen are representations of a wealth of legends and myths.  Sometimes depictions from Norse mythology and Norse legends can be identified, but largely the stories behind them have not survived in written form.

The image stones are valuable sources which complete knowledge from archaeology concerning ships and sails, and they provide information on armor, wagons, and sleighs. The later stones in this group feature an upper field with stylized cross and dragon patterns in the style of some runestones. These stones usually were raised on roads and at bridges to be visible.

Isle of Man 

A comparable tradition is found on the Isle of Man where high funeral crosses of stone were richly ornamented with the same teeming world of warriors and Norse deities as the image stones of Gotland.

Notes and references

Individual image stones 
Ardre stone
Hunnestad Monument
Ledberg stone
Viking art
The Snake-witch
Stora Hammars stones
Tängelgärda stone
Stenkyrka Lillbjärs III stone

External links 

Pictures of stones at Bunge Museum, Bunge, Gotland, Sweden 
The Picture Stone Hall, Gotland Museum, Visby, Sweden 

 
Rock art in Europe
Medieval European sculptures
Stone monuments and memorials
Stone sculptures

Scandinavian history
Gotland
Archaeological terminology (Germanic)
Vendel Period